Vener Zaynullovich Galiev born 1 July 1975) is a Bashkir born-Russian amateur wrestler, sambist and mixed martial artist. He started his professional mixed martial arts career in 2004.

Early life and martial arts career 
Galiev was born to a working class Bashkir family and started his competitive sports career in Greco-Roman wrestling, becoming the Bashkortostan champion. He later participated in Combat Sambo and Unifight on the international level. Galiev became the Combat Sambo World Champion (74 kg) at 2008 World Sambo Championships and 2009 World Sambo Championships.

On 5 December 2009, he participated in the Combat Sambo rules category of the special event Bitva Chempionov IV of the Russian Martial Arts Association in Moscow and defeated the 2009 European Combat Sambo Champion Paul Lening of Germany by points. On 19 November 2010, Galiev faced Dagestan Kudo world champion (76 kg) and mixed martial artist Shamkhal Kerimov in an amateur MMA bout at Bitva Chempionov V in Moscow and defeated his opponent by split decision. On 5 November 2011, he participated in the event Bitva 5 held in Moscow and beat Roman Bagdasaryan in a bout under kickboxing rules.

Galiev holds International Class Master of Sports rank in Combat Sambo and Unifight, as well as Master of Sports rank in Greco-Roman wrestling.

Personal life
Galiev works as a police lieutenant in Ufa. He is married to Alena and has a son named Timur.

Championships and accomplishments

Unifight
International Amateur Federation of Unifight
Unifight European Champion.

ARG (Army Hand-to-Hand Combat)
Russian Union of Martial Arts
3rd Place Russia Championship.

Sambo
All-Russian Sambo Federation
Combat Sambo Russian National Champion.
Russian Combat Sambo National Championships 2nd Place (2010)
Federation International Amateur de Sambo (FIAS)
Combat Sambo World Champion.

Mixed martial arts record 

|-
|Win
|align=center|34–13
|Denis Silva
|Decision (unanimous)
|ACA 148: Magomedov vs Olenichev
|
|align=center| 3
|align=center| 5:00
|Sochi, Russia
|
|-
|Loss
|align=center|33–14
|Mukhamed Kokov
|TKO (leg injury)
|ACA 140: Ramos vs. Reznikov
|
|align=center|1
|align=center|2:17
|Sochi, Russia
|
|-
|Win
|align=center| 33–13
|Artem Damkovsky
|Submission (arm-triangle choke)
|ACA 134: Bagov vs. Koshkin
|
|align=center|3
|align=center|4:00
|Krasnodar, Russia
|
|-
| Loss
| align=center| 32–13
| Herdeson Batista
| TKO (punches)
|ACA 124: Galiev vs. Batista
|
|align=center|3
|align=center|2:29
|Kazan, Russia
| 
|-
| Win
| align=center| 32–12
| Ermek Tlauov
| TKO (punches)
|ACA 116: Froes vs Balaev
|
|align=center|2
|align=center|3:47
|Moscow, Russia
| 
|-
| Loss
| align=center| 31–12
| Amirkhan Adaev
| Decision (unanimous)
| ACA 108: Galiev vs. Adaev
| 
| align=center| 3
| align=center| 5:00
|Grozny, Russia
|
|-
| Win
| align=center| 31–11
| Ermek Tlauov
| TKO (punches)
|ACA 102: Tumenov vs. Ushukov
|
|align=center|2
|align=center|1:38
|Almaty, Kazakhstan
| 
|-
| Win
| align=center| 30–11
| Fabio Ferrari
| TKO (Referee Stoppage)
| Mixfight Promotion - Ural Batyr
| 
| align=center|1
| align=center|0:27
| Ufa, Russia
|
|-
| Loss
| align=center| 29–11
| Diego Brandão
| TKO (doctor stoppage)
| Russian Cagefighting Championship 5
| 
| align=center|1
| align=center|0:50
| Yekaterinburg, Russia
| 
|-
| Win
| align=center| 29–10
| Nikolay Gaponov
| KO (punches)
| Fight Nights Global 82: Minakov vs. Johnson
| 
| align=center|1
| align=center|4:14
| Moscow, Russia
| 
|-
| Loss
| align=center| 28–10
| Diego Brandão
| KO (punches)
| Fight Nights Global 67: Brandão vs. Galiev
| 
| align=center|1
| align=center| 0:39
| Yekaterinburg, Russia
|
|-
| Win
| align=center| 28–9
| Marcio Andrade
| KO (punch)
| MixFace / Tech-Krep FC: MixFace 1
| 
| align=center| 1
| align=center| 2:50
| Yekaterinburg, Russia
|
|-
| Loss
| align=center| 27–9
| Akhmed Aliev
| Decision (unanimous)
| Fight Nights Global 51: Pavlovich vs. Gelegaev
| 
| align=center| 3
| align=center| 5:00
| Kaspiysk, Russia
|
|-
| Win
| align=center| 27–8
| Akop Stepanyan
| Submission (rear-naked choke)
| Fight Nights Global 45: Galiev vs. Stepanyan 
| 
| align=center| 3
| align=center| 3:16
| Ufa, Russia
|
|-
| Win
| align=center| 26–8
| Akhmed Aliev
| TKO (punches)
| Fight Nights: Dagestan
| 
| align=center| 2
| align=center| 4:59
| Kaspiysk, Russia
|
|-
| Loss
| align=center| 25–8
| Adil Boranbayev
| KO (punch)
| Alash Pride - Warriors of the Steppe
| 
| align=center| 1
| align=center| 2:00
| Almaty, Kazakhstan
| 
|-
| Win
| align=center| 25–7
| Yoshiaki Takahashi
| Decision (unanimous)
| Global Fight Club - GFC Challenge
| 
| align=center| 3
| align=center| 5:00
| Krasnodar, Russia
| 
|-
| Win
| align=center| 24–7
| Aziz Amuev
| Decision (unanimous)
| SVS MMA: Commonwealth Cup 2012
| 
| align=center| 3
| align=center| 5:00
| Qashliq,  Russia
| 
|-
| Win
| align=center| 23–7
| Vaidas Valancius
| Submission (guillotine choke)
| ProFC 37
| 
| align=center| 3
| align=center| 2:14
| Ufa, Russia
| 
|-
| Win
| align=center| 22–7
| Tursunbeck Asilgazhiev
| TKO (punches)
| Fight Nights - Battle of Moscow 5
| 
| align=center| 2
| align=center| N/A
| Moscow, Russia
| 
|-
| Win
| align=center| 21–7
| Ian Jones
| TKO (punches)
| Desert Force Championship 2
| 
| align=center| 1
| align=center| N/A
| Amman, Jordan
| 
|-
| Win
| align=center| 20–7
| Ryan Healy
| TKO (punches)
| Fight Festival 30
| 
| align=center| 1
| align=center| 0:43
| Helsinki, Finland
| 
|-
| Win
| align=center| 19–7
| Gaël Grimaud
| Decision (unanimous)
| Fights With Rules 1
| 
| align=center| 3
| align=center| 5:00
| Ufa, Russia
| 
|-
| Win
| align=center| 18–7
| Shamkhal Kerimov
| Decision (split)
| Battle of Champions 5
| 
| align=center| 2
| align=center| 5:00
| Moscow, Russia
| 
|-
| Loss
| align=center| 17–7
| Shamil Zavurov
| Decision (unanimous)
| Fight Nights - Battle of Moscow 2
| 
| align=center| 2
| align=center| 5:00
| Moscow, Russia
| 
|-
| Win
| align=center| 17–6
| Artur Odilbekov
| Submission (armbar)
| Fight Nights - Battle of Moscow 2
| 
| align=center| 1
| align=center| N/A
| Moscow, Russia
| 
|-
| Win
| align=center| 16–6
| Mikko Suvanto
| Decision (unanimous)
| Fight Festival 27
| 
| align=center| 3
| align=center| 5:00
| Helsinki, Finland
| 
|-
| Loss
| align=center| 15–6
| Rustam Khabilov
| Decision (split)
| M-1 Challenge: 2009 Selections 4
| 
| align=center| 2
| align=center| 5:00
| Saint Petersburg, Russia
| 
|-
| Win
| align=center| 15–5
| Mairbek Taisumov
| Decision (unanimous)
| Gladiator - 2009
| 
| align=center| 2
| align=center| 5:00
| Prague, Czech Republic
| 
|-
| Win
| align=center| 14–5
| Bagavdin Gadzhimuradov
| Decision (unanimous)
| M-1 Challenge: 2009 Selections 2
| 
| align=center| 3
| align=center| 5:00
| Saint Petersburg, Russia
| 
|-
| Loss
| align=center| 13–5
| Josh Shockley
| Submission (armbar)
| fightFORCE - Day of Anger
| 
| align=center| 1
| align=center| 1:15
| Saint Petersburg, Russia
| 
|-
| Loss
| align=center| 13–4
| Igor Araújo
| Submission (armbar)
| Universal Fighter
| 
| align=center| 1
| align=center| 0:57
| Ufa, Russia
| 
|-
| Win
| align=center| 13–3
| Okun Almaz
| TKO (punches)
| IAFC - Russia vs. the World
| 
| align=center| 1
| align=center| 1:27
| Novosibirsk, Russia
| 
|-
| Win
| align=center| 12–3
| Seydina Seck
| Decision (unanimous)
| FSiberian Challenge 2
| 
| align=center| 3
| align=center| 5:00
| Bratsk, Russia
| 
|-
| Win
| align=center| 11–3
| Jaroslav Poborsky
| KO (knee and punches)
| M-1 MFC: Fedor Emelianenko Cup
| 
| align=center| 1
| align=center| 0:52
| Saint Petersburg, Russia
| 
|-
| Win
| align=center| 10–3
| Mukhamed Aushev
| Submission (guillotine choke)
| FfightFORCE - Russia vs. The World
| 
| align=center| 2
| align=center| 1:36
| Saint Petersburg, Russia
| 
|-
| Win
| align=center| 9–3
| Roman Potapov
| Decision (unanimous)
| SOP - Star of Peresvit
| 
| align=center| 3
| align=center| 5:00
| Kyiv, Ukraine
| 
|-
| Win
| align=center| 8–3
| Ivan Zagubinoga
| Decision (unanimous)
| SOP - Star of Peresvit
| 
| align=center| 3
| align=center| 5:00
| Kyiv, Ukraine
| 
|-
| Win
| align=center| 7–3
| Rafael Silva
| Decision (unanimous)
| SOP - Star of Peresvit
| 
| align=center| 3
| align=center| 5:00
| Kyiv, Ukraine
| 
|-
| Loss
| align=center| 6–3
| Djalili Salmanov
| Submission (armbar)
| FEFoMP - World Absolute FC
| 
| align=center| 1
| align=center| N/A
| Khabarovsk, Russia
| 
|-
| Win
| align=center| 6–2
| Rustam Bogatirev
| KO (head kick)
| FEFoMP - World Absolute FC
| 
| align=center| 1
| align=center| 3:30
| Khabarovsk, Russia
| 
|-
| Win
| align=center| 5–2
| Le Gou Lian
| TKO (punches)
| FEFoMP - World Absolute FC
| 
| align=center| 1
| align=center| 1:21
| Khabarovsk, Russia
| 
|-
| Loss
| align=center| 4–2
| Beslan Isaev
| TKO (doctor stoppage)
| APF - World Pankration Championship 2005
| 
| align=center| 1
| align=center| N/A
| Astana, Kazakhstan
| 
|-
| Loss
| align=center| 4–1
| Alexander Shlemenko
| TKO (injury)
| IAFC - Stage of Russia Cup
| 
| align=center| 1
| align=center| N/A
| Ulyanovsk, Russia
| 
|-
| Win
| align=center| 4–0
| Jeihun Aliev
| TKO (punches)
| IAFC - Stage of Russia Cup
| 
| align=center| 2
| align=center| 4:51
| Ulyanovsk, Russia
| 
|-
| Win
| align=center| 3–0
| Sergei Kotin
| TKO (punches)
| IAFC - Stage of Russia Cup
| 
| align=center| 1
| align=center| 1:04
| Ulyanovsk, Russia
| 
|-
| Win
| align=center| 2–0
| Alexander Shlemenko
| Decision (unanimous)
| COE - Cup Of Empire 2004
| 
| align=center| 3
| align=center| 5:00
| Kazan, Russia
| 
|-
| Win
| align=center| 1–0
| Magomed Magomedaliev
| KO (punches)
| AFC - Stage of Russia Cup 3
| 
| align=center| 2
| align=center| 2:02
| Omsk, Russia
| 

Record confirmed through Sherdog.com and FightLife.ru

References

External links

Living people
1975 births
Russian male mixed martial artists
Russian sambo practitioners
Russian police officers
Bashkir people
People from Sterlitamak
Russian male sport wrestlers
Mixed martial artists utilizing sambo
Mixed martial artists utilizing ARB
Mixed martial artists utilizing Greco-Roman wrestling